Jabari Hylton (born 5 November 1998) is a footballer who last played for C.D. Once Deportivo of the Salvadoran Primera Division. Born in the United States, he has represented Jamaica internationally.

Career statistics

Club

Notes

International

References

1998 births
Living people
Soccer players from Atlanta
Jamaican footballers
Jamaica international footballers
Jamaica youth international footballers
American soccer players
American people of Jamaican descent
Jamaican expatriate footballers
Association football midfielders
Oxford United F.C. players
Swindon Town F.C. players
Histon F.C. players
UWI F.C. players
National Premier League players
Jamaican expatriate sportspeople in England
Expatriate footballers in England
Pensacola FC players